Robert D. Walter (born 1944) is an American businessman best known for his role in the creation of Cardinal Health.

Early life
Walter graduated from St. Charles Preparatory School in Columbus, Ohio, and received a B.A. degree from Ohio University in 1967. Walter later attended Harvard Business School, where he received an MBA.

Career
In 1971, he founded Cardinal Foods after purchasing a small Ohio food wholesaler. In 1979, the company acquired Bailey Drug Company and began wholesaling drugs. In subsequent years, the company experienced extraordinary growth, "one of a handful of large U.S. companies that had achieved earnings-per-share growth in excess of 20 percent for 15 years straight." Cardinal Health is now a Fortune 100 company and one of the largest distributors of pharmaceuticals, health & beauty products, and hospital supplies in the United States. In 2007, he was #14 on Fortune magazine's list of the 25 top-paid male executives, with total compensation of $42.7 million the previous year. He retired from Cardinal Health at the end of the 2008 fiscal year.

In 2016, after serving on the board since 2006, he was named non-executive chairman of Louisville based Yum! Brands, the parent company of KFC, Pizza Hut and Taco Bell. Walter previously served as a director of American Express, Nordstrom, CBS, Viacom and Westinghouse.

Personal life
He is married to Margaret "Peggy" Walter, who also attended Ohio University.  The Walters have given support to the Ohio University community including Margaret Walter Hall, and to the Columbus Museum of Art, where they donated $10,000,000, the largest gift in the Museum’s history, in 2015. Walter resides in Dublin, Ohio; Boca Raton, Florida; and Park City, Utah.

References

External links
Our history | About us | Cardinal Health

Harvard Business School alumni
Ohio University alumni
Walter, Robert D.
American Express people
Living people
People from Dublin, Ohio
1944 births